Jan Vaclavik (born ) is a Czech male volleyball player. He is part of the Czech Republic men's national volleyball team. On club level he plays for VK Ostrava.

In 2021 he married his girlfriend Míša.

References

External links
 profile at FIVB.org

1985 births
Living people
Czech men's volleyball players
Place of birth missing (living people)